Richard Hodges may refer to:

 Richard Hodges (archaeologist) (born 1952), British archaeologist 
 Richard Hodges (American politician) (born 1963), former member of the Ohio House of Representatives
 Richard Hodges (MP) (died 1572), member (MP) of the Parliament of England for Westminster
 Richard Hodges (surgeon) (1827–1896), American surgeon